Viktor Pusev (born March 28, 1966) is a Soviet sprint canoer who competed from the mid-1980s to the early 1990s. He won five medals at the ICF Canoe Sprint World Championships with two golds (K-4 500 m: 1989, 1990), a silver (K-2 1000 m: 1985), and two bronzes (K-2 500 m: 1985, 1986).

Pusev also finished ninth in the K-1 500 m event at the 1988 Summer Olympics in Seoul.

References

Sports-reference.com profile

1966 births
Canoeists at the 1988 Summer Olympics
Living people
Olympic canoeists of the Soviet Union
Soviet male canoeists
Russian male canoeists
ICF Canoe Sprint World Championships medalists in kayak